Casey Murdock is an American politician and a Republican member of the Oklahoma Senate representing the 27th district since 2018. He previously served in the Oklahoma House of Representatives from 2014 to 2018.

Murdock studied agricultural business at the Oklahoma Panhandle State University, where he graduated in 1992.
He is married and has 3 children.

References

External links
Official page at the Oklahoma Legislature
Campaign site

Casey Murdock at Ballotpedia

Living people
People from Cimarron County, Oklahoma
Republican Party members of the Oklahoma House of Representatives
Oklahoma Panhandle State University alumni
Methodists from Oklahoma
Protestants from Oklahoma
21st-century American politicians
Year of birth missing (living people)